Vildagliptin, sold under the brand name Galvus and others, is an oral anti-hyperglycemic agent (anti-diabetic drug) of the dipeptidyl peptidase-4 (DPP-4) inhibitor class of drugs. Vildagliptin inhibits the inactivation of GLP-1 and GIP by DPP-4, allowing GLP-1 and GIP to potentiate the secretion of insulin in the beta cells and suppress glucagon release by the alpha cells of the islets of Langerhans in the pancreas.

Vildagliptin has been shown to reduce hyperglycemia in type 2 diabetes mellitus.

Combination with metformin
The European Medicines Agency has also approved a combination of vildagliptin and metformin, vildagliptin/metformin (Eucreas by Novartis) as an oral treatment for type-2 diabetes.

Adverse effects
Adverse effects observed in clinical trials include nausea, hypoglycemia, tremor, headache and dizziness. Rare cases of hepatoxicity have been reported.

There have been case reports of pancreatitis associated with DPP-4 inhibitors. A group at UCLA reported increased pre-cancerous pancreatic changes in rats and in human organ donors who had been treated with DPP-4 inhibitors. In response to these reports, the United States FDA and the European Medicines Agency each undertook independent reviews of all clinical and preclinical data related to the possible association of DPP-4 inhibitors with pancreatic cancer. In a joint letter to the New England Journal of Medicines, the agencies stated that "Both agencies agree that assertions concerning a causal association between incretin-based drugs and pancreatitis or pancreatic cancer, as expressed recently in the scientific literature and in the media, are inconsistent with the current data. The FDA and the EMA have not reached a final conclusion at this time regarding such a causal relationship. Although the totality of the data that have been reviewed provides reassurance, pancreatitis will continue to be considered a risk associated with these drugs until more data are available; both agencies continue to investigate this safety signal."

See also
Development of dipeptidyl peptidase-4 inhibitors
Dipeptidyl peptidase-4 (CD26)

References

External links
 

Dipeptidyl peptidase-4 inhibitors
Pyrrolidines
Nitriles
Novartis brands
Carboxamides
Adamantanes
Tertiary alcohols